The Sookie Stackhouse Companion is a book written by Charlaine Harris and published by Ace Hardcover/Ace Books (an imprint of Berkley Books, owned by Penguin Random House) on 30 August 2011. It won the Anthony Award for Best Critical Non-Fiction in 2012.

References 

Anthony Award-winning works
2011 American novels
American fantasy novels
Supernatural books
The Southern Vampire Mysteries
Ace Books books